William Cotter Maybury (November 20, 1848 – May 6, 1909) was an American politician from the U.S. state of Michigan.

Early life

Maybury was born in Detroit, Michigan, on November 20, 1848, the son of Thomas Maybury. He attended public schools in Detroit, graduating in 1866.  He went on to attend the University of Michigan at Ann Arbor, graduating from the academic department with a Bachelor of Arts in 1870 and from the law department with a Bachelor of Laws in 1871. He was admitted to the bar in the latter year and commenced practice in Detroit, entering into a partnership with Edward F. Conely. He was city attorney of Detroit from 1876 to 1880 and lecturer on medical jurisprudence in the Michigan College of Medicine at Detroit in 1881 and 1882.

Politics
In 1880, Maybury ran as a Democrat for a seat in the U.S. House of Representatives from Michigan's 1st congressional district, losing in the general election to Republican Henry W. Lord. Maybury was elected in 1882 to the 48th and again in 1884 to the 49th congresses, serving from March 4, 1883, to March 3, 1887. He was not a candidate for re-election in 1886.

After returning from Washington, D.C., Maybury resumed the practice of law in Detroit. He was elected Mayor of Detroit in 1897, serving out the remainder of Hazen S. Pingree's term after the latter had resigned to become Governor of Michigan.  He was re-elected twice more, serving as mayor until 1904. While mayor, he organized a time capsule, the Detroit Century Box, which contained the letters of 56 prominent citizens and was sealed on December 31, 1900. It was opened 100 years later, on December 31, 2000. Maybury was an unsuccessful candidate for Governor of Michigan in 1900, being defeated by Republican candidate Aaron T. Bliss.

Later life and death
After Edward F. Conley's death in 1888, Maybury formed a law partnership with John D. Conely and Alfred Lucking, calling themselves Conely, Maybury, and Lucking.  Conely retired in 1892 and the firm changed to Maybury & Lucking; it was later known as Maybury, Lucking, Emmons, & Helfman.  Maybury also worked as counsel to the Standard Life & Accident Insurance Company.

Maybury remained a bachelor until the end of his life.

Maybury died in 1909 in Detroit and was interred in Elmwood Cemetery. There is a statue of Maybury in Grand Circus Park in downtown Detroit, which was completed by Adolph Alexander Weinman for $22,000 and unveiled to the public in 1912.

See also
Grand Circus Park
Hazen S. Pingree

References

External links

Letter of William C. Maybury, Mayor to the future mayor of Detroit in "Century Box" Christian Science Sentinel (January 17, 1901). Also contains letter written to Annie M. Knott, one of the people invited to write letters for the time capsule

1848 births
1909 deaths
Burials at Elmwood Cemetery (Detroit)
Mayors of Detroit
University of Michigan Law School alumni
Democratic Party members of the United States House of Representatives from Michigan
19th-century American politicians
20th-century American politicians